The Eparchy of Šumadija is one of the eparchies of the Serbian Orthodox Church, with the seat at Kragujevac, Serbia. Since 2002, it is headed by bishop Jovan (Mladenović).

Church-buildings

Heads

References

External links 
 Official site

Serbian Orthodox Church in Serbia
Religious sees of the Serbian Orthodox Church
Šumadija District
Christian organizations established in 1947
1947 establishments in Serbia
Dioceses established in the 20th century